Arthur Corbin Gould (1850–1903) was an avid shooter and member of the Massachusetts Rifle Association. He published The Rifle [Riling 1160] in 1885. The Rifle was the forerunner to the official publication of the National Rifle Association, The Rifleman, later American Rifleman. Mr. Gould later authored The Modern American Pistol and Revolver, including a description of modern pistols and revolvers of American make; ammunition used in these arms; results accomplished; and shooting rules followed by American marksmen as well as Modern American Rifles. The former was the first English-language book devoted to pistol shooting.

Bibliography
 The Modern American Pistol and Revolver, Boston, A.C. Gould & Co., 1888. [Riling 1220]
 Modern American Rifles, Boston, Bradlee Widden, 1892. [Riling 1309]
 Modern American Pistols and Revolvers, Boston, Bradlee Widden, 1894. [Riling 1220]
 American Rifleman's Encyclopedia, Cincinnati, Peters Cartridge Co., 1902. [Riling 1539]
 Sport; or, Fishing and Shooting (189?)
 (1903). "Arthur Corbin Gould." Western Field. San Francisco

References are to Ray Riling, Guns and Shooting, a Bibliography, New York: Greenberg, 1951.

External links

1850 births
1903 deaths
American information and reference writers
American magazine publishers (people)
19th-century American businesspeople